Hibou may refer to:
Hibou (band), an American indie pop band
Avanà, an Italian grape variety also known as Hibou noir